Barbara Lochbihler (born 20 May 1959, Obergünzburg) is a German politician who served as Member of the European Parliament (MEP) from 2009 until 2019. She is a member of the Alliance 90/The Greens, part of the European Green Party.

Early career
Between 1992 and 1999 Lochbihler was the Secretary General of the Women’s International League for Peace and Freedom. For a decade from 1999 she served as Secretary General at Amnesty International Germany.

Political career
After becoming a Member of the European Parliament, Lochbihler served on the Subcommittee on Human Rights (DROI), including as chairwoman from 2011 until 2014. She was also a member of the Committee on Foreign Affairs (AFET) and the parliament's delegation for relations with the countries of Southeast Asia and the Association of Southeast Asian Nations (ASEAN).

Within her Greens–European Free Alliance parliamentary group, Lochbihler served as the human rights and foreign policy spokesperson.

Already in 2016, Lochbihler announced that she would not stand in the 2019 European elections but instead resign from active politics by the end of the parliamentary term.

Other activities
 Petra Kelly Foundation, Member of the Board of Trustees

References

1959 births
Living people
Alliance 90/The Greens MEPs
Amnesty International people
German anti–nuclear weapons activists
German anti-war activists
German human rights activists
Women human rights activists
MEPs for Germany 2009–2014
MEPs for Germany 2014–2019
21st-century women MEPs for Germany
People from Ostallgäu
Women's International League for Peace and Freedom people